The Journal of Public Health Policy is a peer-reviewed medical journal established in 1980 by Milton Terris. It covers the field of public health and is the official journal of the National Association for Public Health Policy.

Abstracting and indexing 
The journal is abstracted and indexed in CSA Sociological Abstracts, EMBASE, Index Medicus/MEDLINE, PsycINFO, Science Citation Index Expanded, Scopus, and Social Sciences Citation Index. According to the Journal Citation Reports, the journal has a 2011 impact factor of 2.113.

References

External links 
 

Publications established in 1980
Public health journals
Quarterly journals
English-language journals
Palgrave Macmillan academic journals
Academic journals associated with learned and professional societies
Health policy journals